|}

The Faugheen Novice Chase is a Grade 1 National Hunt race in Ireland. It is run at Limerick Racecourse in December over a distance of about 2 miles and 3½ furlongs (2 miles 3 furlongs and 160 yards, or 3,968 metres).

The race is run on St. Stephen's Day, during the course's Christmas Festival. It is currently sponsored by Matchbook betting exchange. It was previously contested at Grade 2 level and was raised to Grade 1 status from the 2018 running. Prior to 2020 it was run as the Greenmount Park Novice Chase before being renamed in honour of Faugheen, the 2019 winner of the race.

Records
Leading jockey (2 wins):
 David Casey – Financial Reward (2008), Dancing Tornado (2009)  
 Emmet Mullins – Sir Des Champs (2011), The Paparrazi Kid (2013)

Leading trainer (7 wins):
 Willie Mullins –  Financial Reward (2008), Sir Des Champs (2011), The Paparrazi Kid (2013), Outlander (2015), Bellshill (2016), Faugheen (2019), Colreevy (2020)

Winners since 1993

See also
 Horse racing in Ireland
 List of Irish National Hunt races

References

Racing Post:

National Hunt races in Ireland
National Hunt chases
Limerick Racecourse